Moldoveanu Peak ("Moldavian Peak"), at , is the highest mountain peak in Romania. It is located in Argeș County, in the Făgăraș Mountains of the Southern Carpathians.

The most popular routes to reach Moldoveanu are over the Viștea Mare, by paths coming from Podragu, Sâmbăta, or by the Viștea Valley.

The closest settlement on the north side is Victoria and on the south side, Câmpulung.

In December 2019, Moldoveanu was selected as the name for the star XO-1 located 536 light-years away in the constellation Corona Borealis, a star that has been confirmed to host an exoplanet.

Ascent  
The most popular routes to reach Moldoveanu are over the Viștea Mare, by paths coming from Podragu, Sâmbăta, or by the Viștea Valley.

An easy way to climb Moldoveanu is from the hut "Stâna lui Burnei" . From Slatina  there is a forest road without asphalt of about 37 km length. As of June 2022, driving on it with normal cars is possible, but challenging and time-consuming. From Stâna lui Burnei, two paths lead to the summit, which are well-suited for a round trip.

Gallery

See also
 List of European ultra prominent peaks

References

External links 
 Moldoveanu Peak and many other photos from the Romanian Carpathians
 "Moldoveanu, Romania" on Peakbagger

Mountains of Romania
Mountains of the Southern Carpathians
Geography of Argeș County
Highest points of countries
Extreme points of Romania